Agonobembix perrieri is a species of beetle in the family Carabidae, the only species in the genus Agonobembix.

References

Platyninae